Girls Cot is a 2006 Nigerian movie produced by Sylvester Obadigie and directed by Afam Okereke. The movie stars Genevieve Nnaji, Rita Dominic and Ini Edo.

Synopsis 
The movie depicts the struggle of university girls to keep up with life by faking their existence. The lead character had to lie that she is a daughter of the vice president and she moved with big people that eventually led to series of problems.

Cast reunion 
Thirteen years after the production of the movie, the four leading actresses held a reunion to celebrate the production of the movie. The reunion was attended by celebrities such as Dbanj, Stephanie Okereke-Linus, Osas Ighodaro, Najite Dede and others.

References 

2006 films
Nigerian drama films
English-language Nigerian films